Sayyid Mojtaba Hosseini Khamenei (born 8 September 1969) is an Iranian Shia cleric and son of Ali Khamenei, the Supreme Leader of Iran. He served in the Iran–Iraq War from 1987 to 1988. He also reportedly took control of the Basij militia that was used to suppress the protests over the 2009 election.

European sources consider him as one of the possible candidates to succeed his father Ali Khamenei, who has ruled Iran for over three decades.

Early life and education
Mojtaba was born in Mashhad in 1969 and is the second son of Ali Khamenei, the Supreme leader of Iran. After graduating from high school, he studied theology. His early teachers included his own father and Ayatollah Mahmoud Hashemi Shahroudi. In 1999, he continued his studies in Qom to become a cleric. Mohammad-Taqi Mesbah-Yazdi, Ayatollah Lotfollah Safi Golpaygani and Mohammad Bagher Kharazi were his teachers there.

Activities and influence
Mojtaba teaches theology in the Qom seminary. He was affiliated with Iranian president Mahmoud Ahmadinejad, and supported Ahmadinejad in the 2005 and 2009 presidential elections.

Journalists stated that he may "have played a leading role in orchestrating" Ahmadinejad's electoral victory, and that he may be "a key figure in orchestrating the crackdown against anti-government protesters" in June 2009, and directly in charge of the paramilitary Basij, a blackout of his name in the regime press notwithstanding. In an open letter, Mehdi Karroubi, ex-chairman of the Majlis (parliament) and a reformist candidate in the 2009 presidential vote, explicitly accused Mojtaba Khamenei of participating in a conspiracy to rig the election, referring to illegal interference of "a network".

Mojtaba is reported to have a strong influence over his father and is talked about as his possible successor. This is thought by some to present a problem, for the Supreme Leader needs to be elected by the Assembly of Experts from among senior Shia Islamic scholars, but it has been noted that the previous incumbent, Ruhollah Khomeini, exerted a strong influence in favor of the choice of Khomeini's father. The Guardian argues that "The strength of Mojtaba's following has not been demonstrated", and while he wears clerical robes he "by no means has the theological status" to rise to Supreme Leader, although it notes that. According to the Los Angeles Times, Mojtaba's religious and political stature may still not be enough for Ali Khamenei to one day unveil his son as his successor. However, the Assembly of Experts is considered by many to be a ceremonial body without any real power. According to The Guardian and French newspaper Libération, among other sources, he is widely believed to control huge financial assets. This allegation was rejected by Assembly of the Forces of Imam's Line, an Iranian political group led by his uncle Hadi Khamenei. Former president Mahmoud Ahmadinejad, his former ally, accused Mojtaba Khamenei of embezzling from the state treasury.

Personal life
Mojtaba Khamenei married Zahra Haddad-Adel in 2004. Their first child, a son named Mohammad Bagher, was born in 2007. The couple's second child, a daughter named Fatemeh Sadaat, was born in 2013. A second son, Mohammad Amin, was born in 2017.

Mojtaba Khamenei is widely believed to control significant financial assets.

See also 

 Khamenei family

References

1969 births
Living people
Children of national leaders
People from Mashhad
Ali Khamenei
Iranian Shia clerics
Al-Husayni family
Iranian Azerbaijanis
Iranian individuals subject to the U.S. Department of the Treasury sanctions